The men's race at the 2022 UCI Mountain Bike Marathon World Championships took place in Haderslev on 17 September 2022.

Result 
142 competitors from 33 nations started.122 competitors reached the finish line.

References 

2022 UCI Mountain Bike Marathon World Championships